István Stumpf (was born on August 5, 1957) is a Hungarian lawyer, political scientist, sociologist, university professor, political science PhD, former constitutional justice at the Constitutional Court of Hungary (from July 2010 to July 2019).  From 1991 to 1994 he was the youth policy adviser to the president of the Republic Árpád Göncz. He also served as minister of the Prime Minister's Office (deputy prime minister) from 1998 - 2002 in the first cabinet of Viktor Orbán. In the beginning of 2021 February he was appointed for a term of 2 years as government commissioner responsible for model change of universities. He was appointed president of the board of the foundation maintaining the newly founded University of Tokaj. This year he was appointed to be a member of Government Committee for Rural Development (1048/2021 (II. 12)).

Studies 
He graduated from Eötvös Loránd University, Faculty of Law with degree in law in 1982, then he received a second degree in sociology from Eötvös Loránd University, Faculty of Humanities in 1985. He received his PhD in political science from Hungarian Academy of Sciences Centre of Excellence, Institute for Political Science, Centre for Social Sciences in 1996. He habilitated in 2008 at Eötvös Loránd University, Faculty of Law and Political Science. In the following years he studied in the United States with German Marshall scholarship (1990) and IREX scholarship  (Harvard University, John F. Kennedy School of Government, George Washington University) (1992-1993). He participated in several courses, like The Council of Europe Summer Management and Language Course (Ealing College, London) (1989-1982) and Case Project for Central and Eastern Europe (Cascade Center for Public Service, Institute for Public Policy and Management, Graduate School of Public Affairs, University of Washington).

Career 
After graduating with a degree in law he worked as an assistant professor at Eötvös Loránd University, Faculty of Law, State and Legal Theory Department (1982-1987). In 1982 he founded and directed the Eötvös Loránd University Bibó István Law College until 1988. Since 1987 he has been a senior researcher at the Institute of Social Sciences of the Central Committee of the Hungarian Academy of Sciences (today: Centre for Social Sciences, Hungarian Academy of Sciences, Centre of Excellence, Eötvös Loránd Research Network). From 1987 to 1997 he worked as an associate professor at Eötvös Loránd University, Faculty of Law, State and Legal Theory Department and Political Science Department. In 1991, he founded the "Századvég" Fin-de-siecle Political School and he was the head of it for two decades (1991-1998, 2002–2010). He is the founding editor of the Fin-de-siecle periodical, responsible editor from 1985 to 1988, and co-author since 1996. From 1997 to 2008, he was an associate professor at Eötvös Loránd University, Faculty of Law, Department of Political Science. Since September 2015, he became from associate habil. professor to full time professor at Széchenyi István University, Ferenc Deák Faculty of Law. He is also teaching different courses in law and political sciences at Eötvös Loránd University, Faculty of Law, Institute of Political Science and taught at Eszterházy Károly University, Political Science Department. From 2019, he became private professor of The Eötvös Loránd University, Faculty of Law. He is a senior research professor at National Civil Service University, American Studies Research Center (since 2018).

From 2010 to 2019 he served as  constitutional justice at The Constitutional Court of Hungary

Since 2021 he is government commissioner responsible for model change of Universities.

Awards and honors 
·        Honorary citizen of Sátoraljaújhely, Sárospatak and Hercegkút

·        Harkály Award, Bibó István Law College, 2013

·        Master Teacher Gold Medal, 2017

·        Middle Cross of the Hungarian Order of Merit, Grand Cross Star, 2019

·        Ferenc Deák award, Lifetime achievement award of the legal Professionals, 2019

·        István Bibó award, Award of the Hungarian Political Science Society, 2019

·        Confrérie de Tokaj

Management experience 
*       Director of István Bibó Law College at Eötvös Lóránd University, (1982–88)

*       Vice - President of Patriatic People's Front

*       President, National Council of Hungarian Youth Organisations (1989–90)

*       President, Századvég School of Politics & Századvég Foundation (Think-tank) (1991–98; 2002–2010)

*       Deputy Prime Minister, Prime Minister's Office (1998-2002)

Fields of research 
*       The political socialisation of youth

*       Parties and party systems

*       Electoral behaviour, party preferences

*       Government structures – systems of governance

*       Constitutionally limited government and separation of powers

*       Separation of Powers and the Constitutional Courts

*       Deep State, Administrative State, Jurocracy

*       American constitutionalism

Memberships and positions in professional organisations 
·        International Political Science Association, Research Committee for Comparative Studies of Electoral Systems and Research Committee on Political Socialization and Political Education, Presidium Member

·        Hungarian Political Science Association, Presidium Member

·        Hungarian Sociological Association

·        OTKA Legal and Social Sciences Committee, member

·        ELTE Faculty of Law, Political Science Doctoral school, doctoral advisor

·        Széchenyi István University Faculty of Law, Doctoral school

·        Harvard Club Hungary, member

·        NISPAcee (The Network of Institutes and Schools of Public Administration in Central and Eastern Europe)

·        European Judicial Network, Federalist Society, Member

·        New Hungarian Public Administration periodical, President of the Board of Trustees

Editorial memberships 
*       „Századvég”, journal of social sciences

*       „Politikatudományi Szemle” ( Political Science Review)– Advisory Board

*       „Nemzeti Érdek”( National Interest), journal of public policy

*       „Falu”, journal of social science

*       „Új Magyar Közigazgatás”,( New Hungarian Public Administration) journal of public administration - President of the Editorial Board

*       Member of the editorial board of „Hungarian Parliamentary Review”

*       Hungarian conservative Editorial Board

The most important publications 

Monographies:

Az Országház kapujában.(In the Gate of the Parliament) Századvég Kiadó, 295 p. Budapest 2007.

Erős állam-alkotmányos korlátok (Strong State- Constitutional Limits). Századvég Kiadó 260 p. Budapest, 2014.

Reinventing Government: Constitutional Changes in Hungary.Gondolat Kiadó, Budapest, 2017.

Különvéleményen a jogállamért!:Stumpf István alkotmánybíró különvéleményei 2010-2017.   (Dissenting Opinions for the Rule of Law) (szerk.: Smuk Péter) Gondolat Kiadó, 207 p. Budapest; Győr 2017.

Alkotmányos hatalomgyakorlás és alkotmányos identitás (Constitutionalism and Constitutional identity) Gondolat kiadó, Budapest, 2020.

Edited Books:

Igéretek sodrásában. A Medgyessy-kormány első éve. Századvég Kiadó, 532 p. Budapest, 2003.

Elzálogosított jövő. A Medgyessy-kormány második éve. Századvég Kiadó, 521 p. Budapest, 2004.

A jóléti rendszerváltás csődje – A Gyurcsány-kormány első éve. Századvég Kiadó, 745 p. Budapest, 2005.

Öszöd árnyékában – A 2. Gyurcsány-kormány első éve, Századvég Kiadó, 597 p. Budapest, 2007.

Végjáték –  A 2. Gyurcsány-kormány második éve, Századvég Kiadó, 567 p. Budapest, 2008.

(V)Álságkormányzás – A 2. Gyurcsány-kormány harmadik éve. Századvég Kiadó, 625 p.  Budapest, 2009.

Hazárdjáték. A szocialista-liberális kormányzás nyolc éve. Századvég Kiadó, 480 p. Budapest, 2010.

Állam és alkotmányosság a járvány hálójában. Ludovika Egyetemi Kiadó  546p. pp. 435–452., 18p. Budapest, 2021

Magyarország 2020-50 év tanulmány az elmúlt 10 évről. MCC Press Kft, 1067 p. Budapest 2021

The most important papers in English:

Reinventing Government and the Separation of Powers, ACTA JURIDICA HUNGARICA: HUNGARIAN JOURNAL OF LEGAL STUDIES 57: (1) pp. 42–58.

Why we Need a Strong but Constitutionally Limited State?: Paradigm of Good Government

In: Contemporary Governance Models and Practices in Central and Eastern Europe . (ed.: Polonca Kovac, György Gajduschek )

Bratislava: NISPAcee, 2015. 113–132.

The Fundamental Law of Hungary

HUNGARIAN REVIEW 5:(2) 36–43. (2014)

Rule of Law, Division of Powers, Constitutionalism

ACTA JURIDICA HUNGARICA: HUNGARIAN JOURNAL OF LEGAL STUDIES 55:(4) 299–317. (2014)

Governance and Public Policy – The first year of the Gyurcsány Government = Central European Political Science Review, Quarterly of Central European Political Science Association, 2006, Vol. 5. No. 18. 26–51.

Problems of transition to democracy in Hungary. Political participation, voting behaviour and partisan attitudes

In: Democracy, socialization and conflicting loyalties in East and West.: Cross-National and Comparative Perspectives . (ed.:  Farnen RF, Dekker H, Meyenberg R, German DB) London: Macmillan, 1996. pp. 121–133.

Evolution of Political Parties and the 1990 Parliamentary Elections

In.: Lawful revolution in Hungary, 1989–94. (ed.: Béla K Király, András Bozóki)

New York: Columbia University Press, 1995.  95–115.

The most important papers in Hungarian:

A kormány alkotmányos jogállása, ÚJ MAGYAR KÖZIGAZGATÁS 8: (2) pp. 8–14.

A tulajdonkorlátozás alkotmánybírósági megítélése. Kontinuitás és változás. In:(szerk.: Smuk Péter) Demokrácia Piacgazdaság Hatalommegosztás. Budapest: gondolat Kiadó, 2017. pp. 11–37.

A tulajdonhoz való jog állam általi korlátozásának határai: Az Alkotmánybíróság döntéseinek elemzése. In: (szerk.: Smuk Péter, Lapsánszky András, Szigeti Péter)

Köz/érdek: Elméleti és szakjogi megoldások egy klasszikus problémára. 652 p.

Budapest: Gondolat, 2017. pp. 379–391.

(Juris Dictio)

(ISBN 978 963 693 764 5)

Takács Péter, Stumpf István, Szigeti Péter Előszó: A közérdekkutatás értelme és aktualitása In: (szerk.: Smuk Péter, Lapsánszky András, Szigeti Péter) Köz/érdek: Elméleti és szakjogi megoldások egy klasszikus problémára. 652 p.

Budapest: Gondolat, 2017. pp. 9–13. (Juris Dictio) (ISBN 978 963 693 764 5)

Az Alaptörvény és az amerikai alkotmányosság, ÚJ MAGYAR KÖZIGAZGATÁS 6: (1) pp. 2–7.

G Fodor Gábor, Stumpf István: Neoweberi állam és jó kormányzás, NEMZETI ÉRDEK 2: (7) pp. 5–26.

Új államépítés – Alkotmányos és kormányzati kihívások = Túlterhelt demokrácia – Alkotmányos és kormányzati alapszerkezetünk (ed.: Gombár Csaba-Körösényi András-Lengyel László-Stumpf István-Tölgyessy Péter) Századvég Kiadó, 2006. 69–108.

Kormányzati kihívások a korábbi MeH miniszter szemszögéből. Magyar Közigazgatás, 2006. LVI. évf. 3–4. szám, 156–173. old.

A „ jó kormányzás” két értelme. = Nemzeti Érdek 2007. I. évf. 3. sz. Századvég Kiadó, 76–94. (Co-author: Gábor G. Fodor)

A kormány a reformkényszer és a bizalomvesztés hálójában. In: Magyarország politikai évkönyve – Kormányzat, közpolitika, közélet 2007-ről. Budapest, Demokrácia Kutatások Magyar Központja Közhasznú Alapítvány, 1259  p. 366-376.p.

Neoweberi állam és jó kormányzás = Nemzeti Érdek 2008. II. évf. 3. sz. Századvég Kiadó, 5-26. (Co-author: Gábor G. Fodor)

„A szuperkapitalizmus” válsága avagy erős állam és társadalmi kiegyezés. = Közigazgatási Szemle, Magyar Közlöny Lap- és könyvkiadó, 2008, Budapest, 16–23.

Kormányválságtól a válságkormányzásig. A szocialista-liberális koalíció felbomlása és a kisebbségi kormányzás kihívása = Magyarország Politikai Évkönyve 2008-ról. (szerk. Sándor Péter-Vass László), 2008., DKMKA, Budapest, 473–490. old.

A jó kormányzás felé. = Jobb közigazgatás helyben járás és visszafejlődés helyett (ed.: Verebélyi Imre-Imre Miklós). Századvég Kiadó, Budapest, 9-27. old. Gellén Mártonnal közösen

Az állam újrafelfedezése és a Neoweberiánus állam = OKRI Szemle (ed.: Virág György), Országos Kriminológiai Intézet, Budapest, 110–124. old.

Állam és kormányzás = Jog-Politika-Állam 2009/3. 150–173. old.

Szakmai alapú közigazgatás-a neoweberiánus állam = A modern állam feladatai (ed.: Halm T. – Vadász J.) Magyar Közgazdasági Társaság-GSZT, Budapest, 2009. 92–104.

Államszerkezet és kormányzati szektor = Magyarország politikai évhuszakönyve. A magyar demokrácia kormányzati rendszere (1988-2008) (ed.: Sándor Péter-Stumpf Anna-Vass László L.) DKMKA 2009., Budapest

Kormányzati kihívások és pártrendszer koncentrálódása. In: A rendszerváltás húsz éve. (ed.: Bayer J- Boda Zs.) 157–187. MTA PTI- L’ Harmattan Kiadó, Budapest, 2010.

Alkotmányozási dilemmák: a régi és az új Alkotmány. In: Húsz éve szabadon Közép-Európában: Demokrácia, politika, jog. Szerk: Simon J. Budapest, Konrad Adenauer Alapítvány, 2010. pp. 139–143.

Közigazgatási bíráskodás az alkotmányos jogállamban. in: Közérdekvédelem: a köigazgatási bíráskodás múltja és jövője. Szerk.: Varga Zs. A.-Fröhlich J. Budapest, PPKE Jog- és Államtudományi Kar, 2011.pp. 15–20.

Stabilitás és ‘zsákmányrendszer’ szerepe a közszolgálati életpályában. In : Új feladatok-átalakuló közszolgálat. Tanulmányok a II : Magyary Zoltán Emlékkonferencia kapcsán. Budapest, Nemzeti Közszolgálati Intézet, 2011.

Az államhatalmi ágak elválasztása-Bibó nyomán. In: Iskola-Társadalom-Politika. Gazsó Ferenc tiszteletére, nyolcvanadik születésnapjára. (ed.: Bihari M.-Laki L.-Stumpf I.-Szabó A.) Budapest, AduPrint, 2012. p. 65-71.

Hatalmi ágak elválasztása egykoron és most. In: Vilagosság, 2013. tavasz/nyár. (ed.: Cs. Kiss Lajos) p. 277-281

Az Alaptörvény és az amerikai alkotmányosság. In: Új Magyar Közigazgatás. Budapest, Complex Kiadó, 2013/1. p. 2-7.

Hatalommegosztás és államszervezet az új Alaptörvényben. In: Állam és jog- kodifikációs kihívások napjainkban. (ed.: Fejes Zs.-Kovács E.-Paczolay P.-Tóth J.Z.) Magyar Állam- és Jogtudományi Társaság. Gondolat, Szeged-Budapest, 2013, p. 23-40.

Personal life
He is married. His wife, Andrea Horváth, works as a judge. They have four children, Anna, Kata, András and Sára. Anna Stumpf Smith Lacey works as executive director of The Hungary Initiatives Foundation.

References

External links
MTI Ki Kicsoda 2009, Magyar Távirati Iroda Zrt., Budapest, 2008, 1010. old., 
Adatlap az ELTE Állam- és Jogtudományi Kar honlapján
Szakmai életrajz Századvég Alapítvány honlapján
Stumpf István, a teflonpolitikus kalandozása az alkotmánybíróságig, NOL

1957 births
Living people
Members of the Hungarian Socialist Workers' Party
Government ministers of Hungary
Hungarian jurists
Fidesz politicians
Constitutional Court of Hungary judges